Studio Other Spaces (SOS) was founded by artist Olafur Eliasson and architect Sebastian Behmann in Berlin in 2014
. The studio works on experimental building projects and artworks for public space.  Eliasson and Behmann’s partnership offers a platform for art and architecture to intersect and enrich each other. 

Studio Other Space’s research includes historical, ecological, social, and emotional parameters of a particular site and its users. Their work connects craftsmanship with material innovation and new technologies.

History
Studio Other Spaces emerged from the long-term creative collaboration of Eliasson and Behmann at Studio Olafur Eliasson, which reaches back to 2001
. Together, the two have worked on numerous architectural projects, including various pavilions; ‘Your rainbow panorama’ (2011) for the ARoS Aarhus Kunstmuseum, Denmark; the façade design of Harpa – Reykjavik Concert Hall and Conference Centre, developed by Studio Olafur Eliasson in collaboration with Henning Larsen Architects; ‘Cirkelbroen (The circle bridge)’ in Copenhagen, 2015; and ‘Fjordenhus (Fjord house)’ in Vejle, Denmark (2009–2018).

Recent projects
 ‘Vertical Panorama Pavilion’ (2020–2022) in Sonoma, California, US. The pavilion's defining feature is a conical canopy, 14.5m in diameter and comprising 832 colourful glass tiles that tell the story of the local weather.
 Lyst Restaurant (2019) inside Fjordenhus, Vejle, Denmark. In interdisciplinary workshops with the restaurant's kitchen team, SOS developed a furnishing concept that creates a direct transfer between the art of cooking and design. 
 ‘Common Sky’ (2019–22), a contribution to the reinvention of the Albright-Knox Art Gallery in Buffalo, New York, US 
 ‘The Seeing City’ (2015–2022) a permanent work of art for the 15th and 16th floor of the Morland Mixité Capitale building in Paris, France.
 Meles Zenawi Memorial Park (2013–) in Addis Ababa, a campus comprising five buildings, several pavilions, and a park, conceived and built with Ethiopian partners and in collaboration with Vogt Landscape Architects.
 ‘The Design of Collaboration’, the studio's first solo exhibition, on display at Kunst Meran Merano Arte in South Tyrol, Italy, from September 2020 through January 2021.  
 ‘Future Assembly’, a contribution to the Venice Biennale Architettura 2021.

References 

Arts organizations established in 2014
Arts organisations based in Germany